"Live Free or Die" is the fifth season premiere episode of the American television drama series Breaking Bad, the first episode of the first part of the season and the 47th overall episode of the series. Written by series creator Vince Gilligan and directed by Michael Slovis, it originally aired on AMC in the United States on July 15, 2012.

The episode is titled after the official motto of the U.S. state of New Hampshire, seen on a license plate in the opening.

Plot 
The episode starts with a flashforward to Walter White in a restaurant on his 52nd birthday. He illegally purchases a machine gun from Lawson which is hidden inside the trunk of a car.

In the present, Walt disposes of any evidence connecting him to Gus Fring's killing and Brock Cantillo's poisoning. Skyler White tries not to speak to Walt, explaining that she is now scared of him. Walt suddenly remembers the surveillance cameras that Gus installed in the superlab, and realizes that the footage Gus may have collected could incriminate him.

The following day, Mike Ehrmantraut learns of Gus's death and drives back to New Mexico in a rage. He comes across Walt and Jesse Pinkman and is prepared to kill Walt, but Walt and Jesse convince him that Gus's laptop, which has been seized by police as evidence, needs to be dealt with.

Mike advises that they all leave the city, as the police will inevitably find them in the lab camera footage. Mike and Walt argue over the best option to take until Jesse suggests that they could use a magnet to destroy the laptop and any evidence of their crimes. Together, Jesse and Walt concoct a plan to use an industrial electromagnet (acquired from Joe at the junk-yard) to destroy the laptop from outside the police building. They pull it off, despite being forced to abandon the truck. As they drive away, Walt defies Mike's doubts that everything is settled.

Meanwhile, Saul Goodman approaches Skyler at the car wash and tells her that Ted Beneke survived the injury from his encounter with Kuby and Huell. Skyler visits Ted in the hospital and finds that he has been fitted with a halo brace. An intimidated Ted tells her that he will remain silent about what caused his injury. Elsewhere, Walt argues with Saul about the lawyer's failure to inform him about Skyler's bailout to Ted. It is revealed that Huell was told to pickpocket Jesse's ricin cigarette, which is why Jesse believed it was lost; Saul presents the cigarette to Walt in a plastic bag, remarking that he had no idea Walt was going to poison Brock in the service of killing Gus. Saul tries to end his and Walt's business relationship, but Walt threateningly tells him, "We're done when I say we're done".

Production 
In July 2011, series creator Vince Gilligan indicated that he intended to conclude Breaking Bad with the fifth season. In early August 2011, negotiations began over a deal regarding the fifth and possible final season between the network AMC and Sony Pictures Television, the series' production company. AMC proposed a shortened fifth season (six to eight episodes, instead of 13) to cut costs, but the producers declined. Sony then approached other cable networks about possibly picking up the show if a deal could not be made. On August 14, 2011, AMC and Breaking Bads production team agreed to renew the series for a final 16 episodes. Filming began for the season on March 26, 2012.

Following a dispute between AMC and Dish Network that led to Dish's dropping AMC as of July 1, 2012, AMC posted the episode online for streaming. The episode is the shortest in the series, with a runtime of approximately 43 minutes.

Reception

Ratings 
"Live Free or Die" was the most watched episode in Breaking Bads history at the time, with 2.93 million viewers.

Reviews 

The episode was praised for the flashforward cold open and Cranston's performance. In 2019 The Ringer ranked "Live Free or Die" as the 23rd best out of the 62 total Breaking Bad episodes.

Notes

References

External links 
"Live Free or Die" at the official Breaking Bad site

2012 American television episodes
Breaking Bad (season 5) episodes
Television episodes written by Vince Gilligan